Saiwa Swamp National Park is located near Kitale, in Trans-Nzoia County, Rift Valley Province, Kenya. It is the smallest national park in Kenya, only 3 km, and was created as habitat for the Sitatunga, a rare aquatic antelope. There are a variety of trees at the national park. Saiwa Swamp National Park is the smallest tour destination park in Kenya, a Sanctuary of the Sitatunga antelope and packed with a lot of wildlife to explore from plants, birds, Insects and reptiles.

References

External links
 Kenya Wildlife Service – Saiwa Swamp National Park
 

National parks of Kenya
Protected areas established in 1974
Geography of Rift Valley Province
Tourist attractions in Rift Valley Province